Theo Paul Doropoulos (born 25 April 1985) is a former Australian cricketer of Greek origin. He played for South Australia, Western Australia and Wellington.

Career
Doropoulos represented Australia at under-19 level, Western Australia at both under-17 and under-19 and played for South Shields Cricket Club in the English North East Premier League. He played as a right-handed batsman and bowled right-arm fast-medium. He made his Twenty20 debut for Western Australia in January 2007 and his first-class cricket and List A cricket debuts in November 2007.

Doropoulos previously held the record for the highest score in an under-19 One Day International, scoring 179 not out against England in 2003.

In June 2011, after being dropped from Western Australia's squad, Doropoulos signed with South Australia.

References

External links

1985 births
Living people
Australian cricketers
Wellington cricketers
Western Australia cricketers
People educated at Hale School
Australian people of Greek descent
Cricketers from Perth, Western Australia
Adelaide Strikers cricketers
South Australia cricketers